Sar Asiab-e Farsangi Rural District is a rural district (dehestan) in the Central District of Kerman County, Kerman Province, Iran. At the 2006 census, its population was 1,631, in 415 families. The rural district has 19 villages.

References 

Rural Districts of Kerman Province
Kerman County